Taubacrex is an extinct genus of birds of the family Quercymegapodiidae from the Late Oligocene to Early Miocene (Deseadan) Tremembé Formation of the Taubaté Basin in the state of São Paulo, Brazil. The type species is Taubacrex granivora. In the original description, Herculano Alvarenga classified it as a member of family Rallidae. It provides the earliest fossil record of gastroliths in birds of the order Galliformes.

References 

Quercymegapodiidae
Paleogene birds of South America
Oligocene animals of South America
Miocene birds of South America
Deseadan
Paleogene Brazil
Neogene Brazil
Fossils of Brazil
Fossil taxa described in 1988
Tupi–Guarani languages